The 2011 European U23 Judo Championships is an edition of the European U23 Judo Championships, organised by the European Judo Union. It was held in Tyumen, Russia from 18 to 20 November 2011.

Medal summary

Medal table

Men's events

Women's events

Source Results

References

External links
 

European U23 Judo Championships
 U23
European Championships, U23
Judo competitions in Russia
Judo
Judo, European Championships U23